Stonehenge is an outback town and locality in the Shire of Barcoo, Queensland, Australia.

Geography
Stonehenge is in the Channel Country.

Nearby is one of three areas used to base the Australian Department of Defence's over-the-horizon radar system.

History

Its name originates from when the area was a stopping point for bullock teams. A stone hut used by the bullock drivers to overnight in eventually fell into disuse, and the stone remains became known as 'Stonehenge'.

The Stonehenge State School opened on 3 September 1900. The school closed in 1947 but subsequently reopened. It closed again on 1 February 1977 but reopened again on 27 January 1981.

The Stonehenge Library opened in 2009.

Facilities 

Stonehenge has a sports centre and community centre.

The Barcoo Shire Council operates a public library at 9 Stratford Street.

Education 
Stonehenge State School is a government primary (Early Childhood-6) school for boys and girls at 27 Bulford Street. In 2017, the school had an enrolment of 7 students with  2 teachers and 4 non-teaching staff (1 full-time equivalent). The school motto is 'Strong and Proud'.

There is no secondary school in Stonehenge. The nearest one is in Longreach ; other options are boarding schools and distance education.

References

Further reading

 McIvor, Roy (2010). Cockatoo: My Life in Cape York. Stories and Art. Roy McIvor. Magabala Books. Broome, Western Australia. .

Towns in Queensland
Central West Queensland
Shire of Barcoo
Localities in Queensland